Lyciasalamandra antalyana, the Anatolia Lycian salamander, is a species of salamander in the family Salamandridae found only in Turkey. Its natural habitats are temperate forests, Mediterranean-type shrubby vegetation, and rocky areas. It is threatened by habitat loss.

Description
The total length reaches 12-13.9 cm. There is a sexual dimorphism: females are larger than males. The head is flattened and elongated. There is a skin fold on the throat. Paratoids (glands) are visible on the back of the head.

Habitat
It prefers temperate forests, scrubby and rocky places. Occurs at altitudes up to 100-650 m above sea level. It is active at night. It is most active in the cooler and wetter winter months, which are also the breeding season.

References

antalyana
Endemic fauna of Turkey
Taxonomy articles created by Polbot
Amphibians described in 1976